AFSC may stand for any of the following:
Affiliate of the Institute of the Brothers of the Christian Schools, used as post-nominal initials
American Friends Service Committee
Air Force Specialty Code
Air Force Systems Command
Air Force Space Command, often abbreviated as AFSPC to avoid confusion with the now defunct AF Systems Command
 Air Force School, Coimbatore, a school run by Indian Air Force